Rainer Brinkmann (born 9 January 1958) is a German politician of the Social Democratic Party of Germany (SPD). He is an SPD leader in the Lippe region, and was a member of the Bundestag from 1998 to 2002.

References 

1958 births
Living people
People from Lippe
Members of the Bundestag for North Rhine-Westphalia
Members of the Bundestag 1998–2002
Members of the Bundestag for the Social Democratic Party of Germany